Jussiville Partanen (born 15 July 1991) is a Finnish ice dancer who currently competes with Arina Klinovitskaya. With his former skating partner, Cecilia Törn, he is the 2015 International Cup of Nice champion, the 2017 Ice Challenge champion, and a three-time Finnish national champion (2016–2018). They won bronze at three ISU Challenger Series events and competed in the final segment at four ISU Championships.

Career

Early career 
Partanen began learning to skate in 2001. He skated with Laima Krasnitskaja in the 2010–2011 season, winning the junior silver medal at the Finnish Championships.

In the 2011–2012 season, Partanen began competing with Canada's Sara Aghai for Finland. They placed in the top ten at both of their ISU Junior Grand Prix assignments and went on to win the Finnish national junior title. At the 2012 World Junior Championships in Minsk, they qualified for the final segment by placing 8th in the preliminary round and 12th in the short dance. They finished 16th overall after placing 17th in the free dance.

In the 2012–2013 season, Aghai/Partanen repeated as the Finnish junior champions. Ranked 24th in the short dance, they did not qualify for the final segment at the 2013 World Junior Championships in Milan. They parted ways at the end of the season.

Partanen teamed up with Cecilia Törn in 2013. In their first season together, the two won the silver medal at the Finnish Championships, behind Henna Lindholm / Ossi Kanervo.

2014–2015 season 
Törn/Partanen placed seventh at the 2014 CS Finlandia Trophy and second to Olesia Karmi / Max Lindholm at the Finnish Championships. They were sent to the 2015 World Championships in Shanghai but were eliminated after placing 25th in the short dance.

2015–2016 season 
Törn/Partanen began the 2015–2016 season by placing fourth at the Lombardia Trophy and fifth at a Challenger Series event, the Finlandia Trophy. Their first international medal, gold, came at the International Cup of Nice in October. In November, they were awarded bronze medals at the 2015 CS Tallinn Trophy and 2015 CS Warsaw Cup. The following month, the two became the Finnish national champions, ahead of Karmi/Lindholm.

Törn/Partanen went on to qualify to the final segment at both of their ISU Championship assignments. Ranked 18th in the short and 14th in the free, they finished 15th overall at the 2016 European Championships in Bratislava, Slovakia. At the 2016 World Championships in Boston, they placed 17th in the short, 19th in the free, and 18th overall.

2016–2017 season 
On 7 July 2016, Törn/Partanen were invited to the 2016 Skate Canada International, their first Grand Prix event, replacing Federica Testa / Lukáš Csölley who withdrew. They started their season by winning the bronze medal at 2016 CS Lombardia Trophy and placing 7th at 2016 CS Finlandia Trophy. In December, they won their second Finnish national title, in Tampere.

In January, Törn/Partanen placed 14th in the short dance, 18th in the free dance, and 17th overall at the 2017 European Championships in Ostrava, Czech Republic. Ranked 24th in the short, the two missed qualifying to the final segment at the 2017 World Championships, which took place in March in Helsinki, Finland.

2017–2018 season 
In September, Törn/Partanen competed at the 2017 CS Nebelhorn Trophy, the final qualification opportunity for the 2018 Winter Olympics. They ranked fifth in the short dance but dropped to ninth overall after the free dance, finishing as third alternates for a spot at the Olympics. They won gold at the 2017 Ice Challenge in November and their third national title the following month.

In January, they finished 15th at the 2018 European Championships in Moscow, Russia. In March, they placed 23rd in the short dance at the 2018 World Championships in Milan. As a result, they did not advance to the final segment for the second year in a row.

2018–2019 season 
Törn/Partanen were invited to the 2018 Grand Prix of Helsinki. They withdrew before the event. In November, they announced the end of their partnership.

2019-2020 season 
Jussiville Partanen teamed up with Russia's Arina Klinovitskaya on August 17, 2019.

Programs

With Törn

With Aghai

Competitive highlights 
GP: Grand Prix; CS: Challenger Series; JGP: Junior Grand Prix

With Törn

With Aghai

With Krasnitskaja

References

External links 

 
 

Finnish male ice dancers
1991 births
Living people
People from Kuopio